The Fire and Ambulance Services Academy is a firefighter training facility owned and operated by the Hong Kong Fire Services Department. It is located in Pak Shing Kok, Tseung Kwan O, Hong Kong. It was opened on 16 March 2016.

It contains a mockup of an MTR train station named Pak Shing Kok.

References

Hong Kong Fire Services Department
Tseung Kwan O
Education in Hong Kong